Ishq Wala Love (Marathi: इश्क वाला Love) is a 2014 Indian Marathi language Romantic Drama film written, directed and produced by Renu Desai under Akira Films and Shree Aadya Films banners. The movie is the directorial debut film of Desai and stars Adinath Kothare and Sulagna Panigrahi in lead roles, with Suchitra Bandekar, Leena Bhagwat, Bhargavi Chirmule, Sukanya Kulkarni, Apurva Nemlekar and Vijay Pushkar among others. The film was released in theatres on 10 October 2014.

Cast

Production
Ishq Wala Love is produced by Renu Desai under her home banner Akira Films and was presented by Shree Aadya Films. It is the second production venture of Desai after her Marathi film Mangalashtak Once More. The film marks the directorial debut of Desai.

Casting
Amruta Khanvilkar was the first choice opposite Adinath Kothare, but then was replaced by Sulagna Panigrahi. Sulagna Panigrahi has previously acted in few Hindi television serial's and Hindi movie Murder 2. This is Sulagna's debut in Marathi film industry with Ishq Wala Love.

Soundtrack

The soundtrack comprises 11 tracks. The soundtrack was released on 22 July 2014.
The film's songs were composed by Avinash-Vishwajeet, Sagar-Madhur and S. J. Suryah (with whom Renu Desai worked under as a costume designer in Kushi), with lyrics penned by Guru Thakur, Shrirang Godbole, Tanishk Nabar, Sandeep Khare and Sangeeta Barve.

Track listing

Release
The film was released on 10 October 2014 in theaters of Maharashtra.

References

External links
 

2014 films
2010s Marathi-language films